Chenery is a surname. Notable people with the surname include:

Ben Chenery (born 1977), British footballer
Charles Chenery (1850–1928), British footballer 
Christopher Chenery (1886–1973), American engineer, businessman and racehorse breeder
Craig W. Chenery, British-born author and screenwriter
Diane Chenery-Wickens (1959–2008), British film and television make-up artist
Hollis B. Chenery (1918–1994), American economist
Penny Chenery (1922–2017), American sportswoman 
Thomas Chenery (1826–1884), British scholar and newspaper editor

Other uses
 Short form of Securities and Exchange Commission v. Chenery Corporation, either of two United States Supreme Court decisions about American federal administrative law:
 SEC v. Chenery Corp. (1943) (also called Chenery I)
 SEC v. Chenery Corp. (1947) (also called Chenery II)